Kermanshah University of Medical Sciences was inaugurated as the Nursing High School in 1968, and became a medical college in 1975. After the Islamic Revolution, it was further developed into the Medical University in 1985. The University has 521 academic staff and 5500 students studying at all levels of medical fields at its faculties, and doing their practical training and placement in Teaching Hospitals, and prepare them for the demands of today's and tomorrow's job market. The university regulates and coordinates the activities of medical education, training and research in healthcare profession throughout Kermanshah Province. In addition to teaching and treatment, it has also been dealing with such areas as research and innovations in order to improve allied health sciences. Among the countless research activities, the university mainly focuses on higher research programs in Basic Medical Sciences, Allied Health Sciences and Nursing. The university also serves the recent scientific and technological leap in the country and promotes the public health by means of scientific strategies and measures. This university has eight Vice-Chancellors, eight faculties, and seventeen Hospitals. eight of these Hospitals are in Kermanshah city, and the others are located in its towns as follows: Islam Abad, Paveh, Javanroud, Sarpole’ Zohab, Sonqor, Sahneh, Qasre-Shirin, Kangavar, Gilan Qarb and Harsin. Based on the vote of 222nd meeting of the Development Council of Universities of Medical Sciences on March 18, 2013, Kermanshah University of Medical Sciences was promoted to type I university. It was also recognized as the national pole of community-oriented medicine at the same year. Moreover, the educational management of KUMS ranked first in the latest educational ranking of universities (RAD plan). Furthermore, in the overall educational ranking of universities in 2011, KUMS ranked first among the universities in the west of Iran. Accordingly, it ranked sixth in the domain of qualitative development of education among universities in Iran. KUMS academic staff are engaged with teaching and research to push the boundaries of human knowledge. KUMS greets people from all over the world, providing historical and general information about campus to visitors, and the public.

Collaborating schools

Adjunct and Visiting Professors
The Adjunct and Visiting Professors below collaborate with KUMS:

Rankings 
According to the latest Academic Ranking of World Universities that released by Shanghai Ranking of Academic Subject 2019, Kermanshah University of Medical Sciences ranks between 201 and 300 among the top universities in the world based on Clinical Medicine.

Faculties

Faculty of Medicine
Faculty of Medicine was founded in 1975. Currently, 192 medical students are studying at this faculty, and over 3878 medical students have graduated so far. The first specialist residency recruitment was started by admitting residents of Anesthesiology in 1991. Nowadays, KUMS is pledged to admit a total number of 141 medical specialties in all medical specialty fields per year. The university is well known for its ability to develop clinical skills in medical students through one of the nation's most robust standardized patient programs and partnerships with lading hospital systems.

Educational Status
Currently, there are eleven basic sciences department, eight departments in master programs, two departments in PhD programs, and twenty two clinical departments at the faculty of medicine. The faculty of medicine has a mission to educate science-based, skilled, and compassionate clinicians prepared to meet the challenges of practicing medicine in the 21st century and conduct cutting-edge biomedical research that enhances people life and advanced the fundamental understanding of medical sciences.

Departments
There are over 35 clinical and basic sciences departments and programs in the faculty of medicine, which are summarized in Table 2.

Faculty of Dentistry
Faculty of Dentistry as a professional educational institution offers a full range of academic courses, including comprehensive undergraduate and postgraduate programs in collaboration with highly experienced academic staff along with proper facilities and the most advanced teaching methods.

Background
Established in 2008, the faculty started admitting students in general dentistry in 2009. Also, students in Oral Health have been accepted at KUMS since 2015. In terms of infrastructure, the newly established faculty of Dentistry in KUMS campus, with an area over 11500 square meters. is the largest faculty in west part of Iran which will be opened at December 2019.

Educational status
The Faculty of Dentistry has 46 academic staff, working in 10 departments in which they have trained 417 students including six international residency students. The table below summarizes the academic staff of the faculty based on their specialties.

References

External links
 

Education in Kermanshah Province
Medical schools in Iran
Buildings and structures in Kermanshah